House of the Rising Sun is a 1976 album by American jazz musician Idris Muhammad.

Track listing
All compositions arranged, adapted and conducted by David Matthews, except for "Sudan", arranged by Tom Harrell

Personnel
Idris Muhammad - drums
Will Lee, Wilbur Bascomb - bass
Eric Gale - guitar, bass
Joe Beck - guitar
Leon Pendarvis, Don Grolnick, Roland Hanna - piano
David Sanborn - alto saxophone
George Young - tenor saxophone
Ronnie Cuber - baritone saxophone
George Devens - percussion
Tom Harrell- trumpet (solo “Sudan”)
Barry Rogers - trombone (solo “Sudan”)
Bob Berg - tenor saxophone
Patti Austin - vocals
plus ensemble and vocalists.

References

External links
 House of The Rising Sun at Discogs

1976 albums
Albums produced by Creed Taylor
Albums arranged by David Matthews (keyboardist)
Idris Muhammad albums
Jazz-funk albums
Kudu Records albums
Albums recorded at Van Gelder Studio